is a  mountain in Takarazuka, Hyōgo Prefecture, Japan.

Outline 
Mount Iwakura is a part of Setonaikai National Park. The mountain is a peak on the eastern ridge of the Rokko Mountains. It is said that the mountain received its name because of the stone shrine (Iwakura) on the top of the mountain.

Access
 Takarazuka Station of the JR Fukuchiyama Line (JR Takarazuka Line)
 Takarazuka Station of the Hankyu Takarazuka Line or the Hankyu Imazu Line

References
 Shozo Tamaki, Rokkosan Hakubutsushi, Kobe Shimbun Shuppan Center
 Official Home Page of Setonaikai National Park
 Official Home Page of the Geographical Survey Institute in Japan

Iwakura